George Edward Shaw (13 October 1899 – 10 March 1973) was an English professional footballer who played for Doncaster Rovers, Gillingham, Huddersfield Town, West Bromwich Albion, Stalybridge Celtic, Worcester City and Floriana.

Shaw played for Gillingham for two seasons before moving back home up north to Doncaster to play for his local club Doncaster Rovers.

In a season which saw Doncaster become runners up in the Midland League and win the Wharncliffe Charity Cup, Shaw scored 6 league goals, 5 of them penalties, plus one penalty in the cup rounds. The following season, 1923–24, Rovers were selected for promotion back to the Football League for the first time since 1905. In their first match of the season Shaw managed to send his penalty kick into the stand, thus missing out on scoring their first return goal and failing to win the match. His last match for Doncaster was at Walsall on 26 January 1924, after which he transferred to Huddersfield Town to play in their first of three successive First Division Championship seasons.

He was the elder brother of Wilf Shaw, who also played full back for Doncaster Rovers, until he was killed in action in World War II.

Honours
Doncaster Rovers
Midland Football League runners up: 1922–23
Wharncliffe Charity Cup winners: 1922–23

Huddersfield Town
First Division champions: 1923–24, 1924–25, 1925–26
runners up: 1926–27

West Bromwich Albion
FA Cup winners: 1931

Floriana F.C.
Malta League 1949–1950
Maltese Cup winner: 1948–1949 and 1949–1950
Cassar Cup 1949–1950

References

External links
 Englandstats.com profile

1899 births
1973 deaths
English footballers
England international footballers
People from Swinton, South Yorkshire
Footballers from Doncaster
Association football forwards
English Football League players
Rossington Main F.C. players
Doncaster Rovers F.C. players
Gillingham F.C. players
Huddersfield Town A.F.C. players
West Bromwich Albion F.C. players
Stalybridge Celtic F.C. players
Worcester City F.C. players
Floriana F.C. players
FA Cup Final players